is a private junior college in Nagano, Japan. It was established in 1966 as a specialized training school. It became a junior college in 1981. It is now attached to Seisen Jogakuin College.

Departments
 Department of English studies
 Department of Childcare

See also 
 List of junior colleges in Japan

External links
  

Japanese junior colleges
Educational institutions established in 1981
Universities and colleges in Nagano Prefecture
1966 establishments in Japan